Mountain View High School is a public high school located in Vancouver, Washington. It was the second high school built in the Evergreen Public Schools, and one of four high schools in the area.

History
Opened in 1981, Mountain View was the second high school built in the Evergreen Public Schools after Evergreen High School and followed by Heritage High School and Union High School. The four high schools share one football stadium, McKenzie Stadium, which is located adjacent to Evergreen High School.

Academic programs
Mountain View High School offers a comprehensive curriculum that includes a wide variety of courses, including: career and technical education, English, fine arts, foreign languages, mathematics, physical education, science, social studies, special education, and performing arts.

Thunder Success Academy
Along with its own students, Mountain View has also introduced and promoted several activities that are designed to help incoming students become successful in their later lives. A well-known example of this is the Thunder Success Academy, or TSA, which has two branches of older students, Thunder Crew, the general workers during the school year, and Thunder Mentors, who not only participate in Thunder Crew, but also attend a summer camp with the freshmen.

TSA has been so successful that other schools in Washington have modeled their own programs after it, in order to make their students feel responsible for each other, though some students just take the program for the .5 credit awarded to each student who takes TSA. TSA has expanded annually to take in several hundred freshmen every year, and introduce many students who have moved into the area to their new environs. 

TSA talks about caring for every student and also is a chance for students to plan out their future goals.  

The background of the school is

Advanced Placement
Mountain View High School has one of the largest Advanced Placement (AP) programs in the area. Courses offered at the AP level include Biology, Chemistry, Physics, Calculus, Statistics, Computer Science, European History, U.S. History, U.S. Government and Politics, Comparative Government and Politics, Micro and Macroeconomics, Psychology, English Language and Composition, English Literature and Composition, Spanish, German, Human Geography, and Studio Art, but new course options are being added each year. AP classes can also be taken as an Independent Study in some departments.
For the 2008-2009 school year, 86% of all AP exams taken by Mountain View students earned passing scores.

Need Based Programs

Mandy’s Pantry

Mandy's Pantry is a food security program at Mountain View High School that opened in 2012. It was named in honor of a Mountain View Graduate, Mandy Lathim who died in a traffic accident. The pantry is one of the food pantries connected to the Evergreen school district's pantry project. The Pantry Project's mission statement is  "To ensure that a students learning and development are not impaired by their lack of nutritious food." The Pantry Project is sustained entirely by donations from the community. The pantry's main community partner is SHARE of Vancouver WA and are also supported by many grocery stores, restaurants, businesses and churches in the area.

Extracurricular activities
Mountain View is home to a thriving music program. There are 3 concert bands, 2 jazz bands, two orchestras, one percussion ensemble, several choral groups, and dozens of student-organized chamber ensembles that compete at the Solo & Ensemble Contest. In December 2011, the school's top Jazz band was invited and had the opportunity to perform at the Midwest Clinic in Chicago, IL.  Many of the music groups tour during the year, such as up to Seattle or down to California. In 2013, the Wind Ensemble was accepted as a featured band in the Music for All National Concert Band Festival.

Mountain View also has strong academic extracurricular activities, including:

 Knowledge Bowl (2007 4A State Champs)
 Science Bowl
 Key Club
 Robotics Team
 Speech and Debate
 Science Olympiad
 HOSA (Future Health Professionals)
 Math Club

Athletics
Mountain View participates in the Greater St. Helens 3A league and is a member of the Washington Interscholastic Athletics Association (WIAA). The school has been league champs in football in 2016, 2017, and 2018. The school colors are royal blue, emerald green, and white. The school's mascot is Thunder, as represented by Thor and Thundra (a god and goddess that ride in a chariot wielding thunder bolts). However the school now uses Thunder Man as a mascot in pep rallies and assemblies.

Recently the school has been using a character called Blueman, though it is unclear whether he is replacing or supplementing Thunder Man.  Over the past decade, an intense rivalry has developed between Mountain View and Evergreen High School. This rivalry is generally lighthearted, but has been known to spark fights and small riots at sporting events involving the two schools, including recent acts of vandalism to both schools prior to game. Another rival of Mountain View High School is Union High School.

State championships
 Boys Soccer: 1991, 1992, 1993
 Girls Track: 1989
 Softball: 1994
 Men's Golf (Individual): 2018

State runners-up
 Boys Soccer: 1994
 Boys Tennis: 1995
 Girls Basketball:  1995
 Softball: 2007

Honors
From 2007 to 2009, Mountain View was named by Newsweek as a top public school in America, placing 777 of 1500. This list represented the top 6% of schools in the nation at the time.

In June 2010, Newsweek again listed Mountain View High School in its annual list of "America's Best High Schools," which included 1,600 (about 6 percent) of the nation's high schools. Mountain View was ranked 680th nationally and 11th out of 32 high schools listed in the state of Washington.

Faculty
Patricia Downey, a former Pre-AP Freshman English and Spanish 1-2 teacher and Key Club advisor, was recognized as a Women of Achievement by Clark College and The YMCA of Clark County.

In 2015, Patricia Redding, a Computer Science teacher, received the Educator Award from the Oregon and Southwest Washington Affiliate of the National Center for Women & Information Technology.

Notable alumni
Daron Alcorn, American football player
Derek Raivio, a star basketball player who set Clark County Scoring records at MVHS and later went on to star at Gonzaga University.
Rian Lindell, a professional kicker in the NFL. Lindell has played for the Seattle Seahawks and Buffalo Bills at the professional level.
Michael Roos graduated in 2000 and was formerly the starting left tackle for the Tennessee Titans (Now retired).
Robert Ramsay, played major league baseball for the Seattle Mariners after starring at Washington State University.
Scott Boothby as a professional Track and Field Athlete he participated in 3 Olympic Team Trials (1996, 2000, 2004) and made 2 USA Track and Field Teams.
Grayson Anderson, went to Washington State University for track and field. Is commonly known as JxmyHighroller (the name of his YouTube channel which has over a million subscribers)
Shawn Hosseini (commonly known as BBN Bosko)is a Musical artist who went to MVHS

See also
 Evergreen Public Schools

References

External links
 Mountain View High School
 GSHL Football - Mountain View High School

High schools in Vancouver, Washington
Public high schools in Washington (state)
Educational institutions established in 1981
1981 establishments in Washington (state)